The Matai'an Wetland Ecological Park is a wetland in Guangfu Township, Hualien County, Taiwan.

Name
Matai'an, which means tree bean, comes from the Matai'an tribe of the indigenous Ami people who inhabit the area around the wetland. The wetland is also called the Fataan Wetland Ecological Park.

History
The area around the wetland has been used by the local tribe for farming and fishing. Recently, the area has been developed for tourism purpose where currently it has three inns.

Geology
The wetland is located at the foot of Mount Masi and spans over an area of almost 100 hectares. The wetland is formed by the flow of Fudeng River. The wetland consists of around 100 types of water plants. It is also equipped with bicycle trail.

Ecology
Species found in this wetland are various aquatic fishes, amphibians, butterflies and shorebirds. There are also around 100 aquatic plants found in the pond. The number of butterflies spike during spring time.

Transportation
The wetland is accessible within walking distance southwest of Guangfu Station of Taiwan Railways.

See also
 Geography of Taiwan

References

Landforms of Hualien County
Wetlands of Taiwan